In January 2005, two parents were shot dead in Tal Afar, Iraq, as they were driving from a hospital. They had been mistaken for suicide bombers.

Local parents shot dead
On Tuesday, January 18, 2005, Hussein and Kamila Hassan and 5 of their children were traveling home in their red Opel Vectra sedan in central Tal Afar. The Turkmen Shiite family had been at the hospital as Kamila had been ill. Samar Hassan remembers they left their home at sunset when it was raining and this would suggest the family set out for the hospital after Hussein Hassan returned home after work at the Electricity office, where he was a clerk. It can be reasonably presumed that he made the short journey to work each day in this sedan and, after almost two years, must have had some encounters with the occupying military force (predominantly American but Australians were also there initially) and he have been aware of its belligerent routines.

The hospital visit must have been reasonably brief as the sun had set but Mansour Boulevard was still wet in the dusk light as they entered it on their return journey. It was approximately 5:50pm and, as twilight and the 6pm curfew arrived, the car had entered the Al-Sarai neighborhood where at least two combat squads were conducting a 'presence patrol' (probably as part of Operation Virgo). This 'dismounted' patrol was likely maintaining a secure route for the Coalition main combat outpost (COP) (located in the Ottoman-era Tal Afar Citadel) and the Coalition military base 'FOB Sykes' (10 miles south at the Tall Afar Air Base) with an uncodified mission to prevent 'terrain denial.' (ie. try to prevent insurgents planting bombs).

The 3rd platoon and support unit which consisted of 1 medical evacuation vehicle (MEV) from A/1-5 (Alpha Company, 1st Battalion, 5th Infantry Regiment (1/5IN) 1st Stryker Brigade Combat Team, 25th Infantry Division (1/25ID) (out of Fort Lewis, WA)), an interpreter (who didn't speak Turkmen, the language of 80 per cent of the population) and 'embedded' Getty Images photojournalist Chris Hondros. They were walking tactically along the road, initially at intervals of approximately 20 meters, and no doubt difficult to see in their camouflaged uniforms against the closed, dull shopfronts and fading light.

Hussein Hassan unwittingly drove towards the soldiers, according to his son, Rakan, in the rear seat,[at least, as reported by Newsweek) but Hassan was not approaching a checkpoint as was erroneously reported in numerous media, including the BBC, The Guardian and The New York Times as per an untruthful statement from Coalition Central Command that was echoed in Associated Press and Agence France Presse media releases issued the following morning. They were approaching a dismounted patrol of 3rd platoon.  Chris Hondros later said he heard the car's engine whining as if it was speeding up and this is probably true as vehicles that turn off an intersection and that travel down slight inclines (as Mansour Blvd is, at this point) may be expected to be increase speed, up to the speed limit. It is likely that the driver, Hussein Hassan, was also conscious of the impending curfew at 6pm - this was interpreted by some locals (in a culture that did not value clock-watching) and sometimes enforced by the Coalition military - as nightfall.

Interdiction
As Hussein Hassan took a right-hand turn down Mansour Boulevard towards the dispersed squad from about '100 yards,' someone called out: "car" A warning shot was authorized, then fired,  there was no visible or audible change to the vehicles movement or tone. A second warning shot was fired. (A warning shot is intended to bring the attention of the entity to bear. It is fired near the thing in question, whether it be human or machine.) After no change was noted and the car decidedly speed up an officer said "Somebody Stop that car!" There was an immediate short burst of gunfire which, according to an internal United States military report, was aimed at the front tire or engine compartment. The driver and passenger were assumed to be a large threat, so they were targeted as well. One of these shots likely killed Kamila Hassan. The soldiers had not, as per the Rules of Engagement [ROE], identified a legitimate military target and these same rules say "Do not fire warning shots." One soldier has written "When the vehicle failed to stop, several soldiers then fired directly at it  with semi-automatic fire (hitting the windscreen, left,right and center), which killed the driver and the front passenger and wounded at least one child in the back passenger seat.

'Embedded' eyewitness
Indeed, according to Newsweek, six soldiers had quickly shot at the Hassan's car with their Colt submachine guns M249 light machine gun (and possibly also Benelli 12-gauge military shotguns) and 'embedded' eyewitness photojournalist Chris Hondros said-

There was a "cacophony of fire, shots rattling off in a chaotic overlapping din. The car entered the intersection on its momentum and still shots were penetrating it and slicing it. Finally the shooting stopped, the car drifted listlessly, clearly no longer being steered, and came to a rest on a curb."

The vehicle had come to a stop (unusually) at a near right-angle against the curb. Within 24 hours, a '15-6' military inquiry (by the soldiers' own superiors) found that the soldiers' actions were effectively "reasonable in intensity, duration, [and] magnitude."

Victims
Both parents, Hussein and Kamila Hassan, were killed instantly by multiple shots to the head and upper body. An apparent exit wound on Hussein's face suggest that at least some of the fatal shots came from behind as the car receded from the shooter(s). One of the five children, Rakan, 11, was rendered a paraplegic (and incontinent) by a serious wound to his lower back that sliced his sacrum and damaged his bowel and bladder.  He was treated at the roadside for approximately 15 minutes to prevent blood loss and transported to and treated at Tal Afar hospital (and, a week later, moved to Mosul hospital). Jilan was treated for shrapnel injuries to her face; Samar, 5, was treated for a bullet wound to her right hand and cuts to her face; and Rana was apparently physically uninjured but traumatized to the extent that she developed incontinence. It is not clear if infant Mohammed was actually in the car at the time of the shooting. They were all taken to Tal Afar hospital before 7pm, where the bodies of their parents were deposited at the hospital's morgue. Rakan stayed at the hospital while the other four children were returned to their home by an ambulance driver as the soldiers had already returned to their base, (apparently, after a brief meeting en-route), in time for the first report to be submitted before 9pm and the second before 9:15pm.

In 2006, Rakan Hassan was flown to Boston for treatment for his paralysis, damaged nerves in his right foot and the six pieces of shrapnel still lodged near his spine. This was due, primarily, to the efforts of American aid worker, Marla Ruzicka, Senator Ted Kennedy and philanthropist Raymond Tye. In January, 2007, Rakan was returned to Iraq (at the time, arguably, the most dangerous country in the world) and is said to have been killed there on June 16, 2008 in a bomb blast on his brother-in-law's home in Mosul (his uncle later speculated he was targeted by insurgents who thought he, the uncle, was an American spy because he had accompanied Rakan to Boston).

'Sympathy' payment
The Coalition military, represented by the United States, later indicated an 'elder,' of the orphaned children, Abdul Yusuf, would receive $7,500 as a gesture of sympathy but the New York Times reported that the children all went to live with their oldest sister in Mosul and may not have benefited from the money.

A concerned American citizen Malcolm Mead, established a fund-raising website for the orphans and raised more than $10,000 within 14 months although it appears this money may have been spent assisting Rakan receive medical treatment in Boston as, in 2011, the New York Times was reporting the surviving children did not have enough money for clothes. Contrary to what Chris Hondros said in August, 2005, it appears the fund raising money did not "set [the children] up for life." Less than a decade later, Samar Hassan said "No one helped us after the death of my mother and father. No one had any mercy on us or gave us a penny."

Chris Hondros
Chris Hondros took powerful pictures of the shooting and aftermath and quickly sent at least two of the photos onto Getty Images New York City headquarters via Milan. Hondros won several awards for the still photos of five-year-old Samar Hassan, including World Press Photo (Spot News) second prize, 2006, and the Robert Capa Gold Medal, 2005, for "Best Published photographic reporting from abroad requiring exceptional courage and enterprise...for his reporting on "One Night in Tal Afar." This photo appears to have been published most widely in Europe, Canada and Ireland, which is to say, countries not directly involved in the war and his series of photos remain current on the BBC News website. There was a photo slide show along with Hondros' account of the incident published on Newsweek.com., however, this story contains factual inaccuracies, misleading statements, and conspicuous omissions. Newsweek suggested that the incident was emblematic of the "horrors of war," which is to say, they removed agency as a determining factor. On January 31, 2005, Lieut. Col. Steve Boylan told Newsweek that "In a perfect world, it wouldn't happen. But we're not in a perfect world."

Chris Hondros left his embedded position after just six days and only two days after perhaps risking his life on the Sunday afternoon to photograph this same company in a courageous light during an ongoing firefight (but he didn't let the grass grow under his feet as he was in Baghdad later that same day recording Sen. John Kerry's third visit to Iraq). The images Hondros took raise important questions about photojournalism ethics in regard to defenceless, traumatized (orphaned) children and ethical- and legal-consent as well as the regime of journalism 'objectivity' where journalists consider themselves detached bystanders that privileges scientific-determinist behavior above active caring and compassion.

While Hondros was an independent witness, his written accounts and quotes to journalists about the incident in four respected publications immediately and years after the event attest to the value of the 'embedded' strategy for the Coalition military in that Hondros occasionally uses language to downplay the incident, suggesting his patriotism (or at least, native US acculturation) overrode his commitment to complete objectivity and the absolute truth (for example, in The Independent, 20 Jan, 2005, he infers it was dark at the time of the shooting when it was not; he states that Rakan had been "winged" when it must have been immediately clear to him - only meters away on the street and at the hospital- that Rakan had sustained a very serious injury when he couldn't move his legs at all and was bleeding profusely; and in Boston to document Rakan's surgery a year later, captions on his photos still infer there was a checkpoint). These statements are perhaps understandable given he relied on the soldiers for his own safety, security, food, shelter and transport and he probably established quick friendships with some of them. Hondros was killed in Misrata, Libya in 2011.

Visibility
Significantly, while dusk was receding to evening and street lights and car headlights were beginning to have an effect, there was clear visibility at the time of the shooting. The rain had cleared and, as the soldiers' weapons had telescopic sights and gunlights, identifying that there was a front seat passenger (and 4-5 in the rear?) should have been quiet straightforward. Inside the car, as it had traveled along the boulevard, Rakan Hassan, aged 11, had been the first to see one or more of the soldiers but, as he alerted his father, there was the burst of gunfire and then the "cacophony of [gun]fire" which killed his parents and hit him and one of his sisters, Samar.

Signalling
Some news reports, quoting military officials, suggest the soldiers used "visual signals" to attract the attention of the driver, Hussein Hassan, although Chris Hondros later said the soldiers immediately raised their weapons when they heard "Stop that car!" If there were any signals, it is possible that their gestures were 'Western' in that indicating with one arm (while holding a heavy weapon in the other) did not take into account local cultural differences where the waving of one arm may not necessarily be interpreted as a warning to stop (arms crossed above head and legs planted firmly and widely may be a more appropriate signal to warn). The soldiers did not use any other non-lethal methods of warning such as spotlights, lasers, flares, Arabic or Turkmen signs, flags, air horns, traffic cones, portable speed bumps, collapsible spikes strips or even grenade simulators.

Insurgent behaviour
Coalition belligerent soldiers in Tal Afar, to January 18, 2005, had been regularly exposed to street attacks most often consisting of small-arms fire and rocket-propelled grenades (RPGs). Mortars or shots fired at the 'Combat Outpost' in the Tal Afar Citadel were also reported. To January 18, 2005, the American military SIGACT administration database lists 156 enemy actions of which 103 were "direct fire".

There had also seen 70 'IED' (concealed bombs) attacks in Tal Afar or the wider vicinity since the start of the invasion in March, 2003 although it appears the only Coalition death from IEDs in the Tal Afar wider area was on February 16, 2004 when one United States soldier was killed. However, 11 local civilians or Iraqi police had also been killed by IED's to this time. The most deadly attack was on September 30, 2004 when 4 locals were killed and 16 injured when a bomb exploded outside a Tal Afar mosque.

Suicide attacks
In a media release the following day, Coalition Central Command intimated that the soldiers may have feared a suicide car bomb attack (SVBIED) although none had been reported in Tal Afar to this date. Mosul, 80 km East, had had seven suicide-vehicle attacks (on six occasions) in the previous 12 months (although since November, 2004, an additional four bombs hidden in stationary, unoccupied vehicles suggested the insurgents' modus operandi had changed in that city, at least). As the Hassan car approached, the weight of two adults and 6 (malnourished) children may have suggested the car contained more than just one driver (that said, there are reports of insurgents strengthening rear suspensions struts to try to conceal a heavy amount of explosives so the appearance of a vehicle was an unreliable determinant in this regard).

It was much more likely the vehicle was not a suicide bomber and the fact that the soldiers did not take cover in nearby alley ways or an adjacent open patch of land suggests they instinctively knew this (half of all suicide attacks to Jan., 2005, occurred in Baghdad and some bombers, at least, were rigged so that they had to hold their hand on the trigger to stop it detonating, meaning shooting at them at close range was not a particularly safe strategy). As at January, 2005, Tal Afar had not had a suicide car bombing; the car had a passenger in the front seat; the car was not near an official checkpoint, a (perceived) common target; the vehicle did not match the common profile of a suicide attack vehicle (in Jan, 2005, a utility 'pick up') and the three Stryker vehicles that were stationed ahead were armored, were blocking the right-hand lane ahead, and had presumably been parked there surreptitiously on the covert patrol (indeed, they weighed 19 tonnes and Italian-made landmines could not destroy them). These factors all suggest both the soldiers on foot and the Strykers themselves were unlikely targets on a cool, late afternoon in Winter as the curfew approached.

Coalition military strategy
The initial, active belligerent countries in the Iraq War were Australia, Denmark, Poland, United Kingdom and the United States of America. This incident appears emblematic of a Coalition and, in particular, an American approach to the insurgency in the area at this time and even Iraq more widely, despite the fact that Tal Afar, was initially considered "Pro-American" given its very large majority Turkmen population, a millennia of Ottoman history and that it is only some 70 kilometers from the border of one of the United States allies, Turkey.

Yet, as David R. McCone, Wilbur J. Scott, and George R. Mastroianni (2008) note in reviewing Coalition forces in Tal Afar in 2005: "The 3rd ACR [not the unit involved in the aforementioned incident but of the culture and using the same tactics and resources] was neither configured nor trained to fight person-on-person, much less confront an ill-defined insurgency. Featuring Bradley fighting vehicles, Abrams tanks, Apache attack helicopters, and armed-to-the-teeth dismounts, it settled into aggressive, armor-based patrolling and searching routines. Though well-intentioned (!), these heavy-handed techniques were better suited for a conventional battlefield than one populated by towns, villages, and, of course, civilians." Staff Sergeant (S-Sgt) Darrell Griffin said in Nov., 2004, "We have made our dominance known throughout the city just waiting for someone to pick a fight with us" and later, he was of the view that "Each man [soldier] had to project balls as big as ten men" as part of a consistent "show of force."

It appears this incident (and hundreds of others like it) did prompt an evaluation of strategy as the United States military released the "Escalation of Force Handbook" in July 2007. By 2009, however, "Escalation of Force" incidents (such as this one in Tal Afar) had seen 2,899 civilians killed or injured and 120 insurgents killed by coalition forces while in the same period, 13 coalition soldiers were killed under the same circumstances. Among the more shocking were the killing of 6 members of one family on Sept. 29, 2004 near Saqlawiyah and the killing of 7 members of one family (and 2 injured) at 'Hurricane Point' on June 14, 2005. In its administration SIGACT system, the United States military refers to these as "Friendly Actions."

Chain of command
For this incident, the chain of command appears to have been-

Mr. George W. Bush, Commander-in-Chief

Mr. Donald Rumsfeld, Secretary of Defense

Commanding General George W. Casey Jr.

Lieut. Gen. David Petraeus, Multi-National Security Transition Command - Iraq [North]

Brig. Gen. Carter Ham

Col. Robert Mark Brown (1st Brigade)

Lt. Col. Mark Davis

Command Maj. Brent Clemmer

Capt. Thomas Siebold (Alpha Company).

References
This account relies on more than 50 references which will be added in due course.

2005 crimes in Iraq
Violence in Iraq